The Human Atom Bombs is the fourth album by the punk rock band, Randy, released in August 2001 by Epitaph Records/Burning Heart Records. It is the band's first release on Epitaph Records.

Critical reception
The Human Atom Bombs received critical acclaim. Most reviews praised the band for crafting their own original sound that borrowed from the founders of rock n' roll and punk rock, while also praising the band for shifting and maturing their sound from previous albums that were more in line with melodic hardcore and skate punk.

In her review of the album, AllMusic's Jo-Ann Greene awarded the album a score of 4.5 out of 5 stars, praising the band's ability to be "smart and witty, well-read but not pretentious, equally adroit at addressing everyday concerns and larger societal issues," while still "[boasting] strong melodies and storming performances. Plus, their music is anthemic but still kicks butt." Greene favorably compares the band's efforts in their previous 1998 album, You Can't Keep a Good Band Down, with their efforts in The Human Atom Bombs, complimenting the band's maturity into "a more diverse and evolved sound to support their militant message." Greene also points out the band's homage to previous bands in their style, including The Stooges, The Clash, and the founders of rock n' roll like Little Richard and Eddie Cochran. In concluding the review, Greene calls the album "a wild ride across past and present."

In his review of the album for PunkNews, Chris Moran, who awarded the album 4 out of 5 stars, points out that the track "Addicts of Communication" gave him "a Clash flashback" and compliments the album for offering "not your normal Swede-Pop-Punk" in the midst of other Swedish punk rock bands like No Fun at All, Millencolin, and Bombshell Rocks. Moran praises the band for their "powerful politically charged lyrics" and for "[delivering] their feelings of anarchy in a swagger that has not been heard for some time." Moran cites "Karl Marx and History," "Proletarian Hop," "Freedom Song," "Summer of Bros," "Shape Up," and "Rockin' Pneumonia and the Punk Rock Flu" as stand-out tracks.

While not awarding the album with a star rating, Exclaim! reviewer Rob Ferraz called the album "an excellent collection of catchy anthems with a message worth hearing" and complimented the band for "[branching] out compared to their G7 release in 1999." He continues in the review to say, "One of the coolest things about this is the '50s rock n' roll influence," pointing out the evident influences from Little Richard, Eddie Cochran, and Amos Milburn throughout the album: "instead of a bunch of former straightedge 20-somethings who slick their hair back in pompadours and sport Buddy Holly glasses, these guys actually know their music history." He concludes the review by saying, "If Randy were the Clash, this would be their London Calling."

In their review of the album, Ox Fanzine (a subsidiary of Germany's music-focused Fuze Magazine) praised the album, calling The Human Atom Bombs "incredible" and positively juxtaposing the record with Randy's previous "not bad, but also rather unoriginal" output. They praised the album for its musical diversity and said that while Randy reminded them of The Clash, the comparison was "unfair" because the band had crafted a unique and original style blending "garage, pop, rock n' roll, and hardcore." The review does not name any standout tracks or award the album with a formal rating.

Track listing

Information
 Recorded and mixed at Pelle Gunnerfeldt Studio (Pelle's Place)
 Produced by Pelle Gunnerfeldt
 Mastered at Polar Studios by Henrik Jonsson
 Artwork by Henrik Walse and Torbjörn Persson

Credits 
 Fredrik Granberg - drums
 Johan Gustafsson - bass, background vocals
 Stefan Granberg - vocals, guitar
 Johan Brändström - guitar, background vocals, some lead vocals
 Randy - primary artist, producer

References

2001 in Swedish music
2001 albums
Randy (band) albums
Burning Heart Records albums
Epitaph Records albums
Pop punk albums by Swedish artists